Judge Thenjiwe Khambule is a South African comedy series created and written by Thenjiwe Moseley and produced by Zamo Missie,

Plot 
The plot consist of different court cases introduced each week, starring Thenjiwe as the judge, who presides over the cases. Much as the show has been scripted, it is based on real life court cases but given a colourful and satirical twist.

The show which initially began on YouTube was later picked up by Moja Love, is on its third season with 39 episodes to date. In season 1, the first episode premiered on 17 February 2018 and the season finale was on 12 May 2018. Season 2 premiered on 18 August 2018 with the finale on 10 November 2018 and season 3 began on 17 November, and ended on 9 February 2019.

Cast

References 

South African comedy television series
2018 South African television series debuts
2019 South African television series endings
Zulu-language television shows
English-language television shows